Raipur City South Legislative Assembly constituency officially, Raipur Nagar Dakshin is one of the 90 Legislative Assembly constituencies of Chhattisgarh state in India. The seat is formed in 2008 after the demolition of Raipur Town Vidhansabha Constituency. It is part of Raipur district. Former Minister of Chhattisgarh Government Brijmohan Agrawal is Incumbent MLA since 2008 & won three times from this seat only.

Members of the Legislative Assembly

Election results

2018

2013

2008

See also
 List of constituencies of the Chhattisgarh Legislative Assembly
 Raipur district

References

Raipur district
Assembly constituencies of Chhattisgarh